The Australia women's national lacrosse team represents Australia at women's lacrosse. It is governed by the Australian Lacrosse Association and is a full member of the Federation of International Lacrosse. They have won the Women's Lacrosse World Cup twice, in 1986 and 2005, and have been runners-up 4 times. They are currently ranked fourth in the world, finishing behind the United States, Canada and England at the 2017 FIL Women's Lacrosse World Cup, which was held in Guildford, Surrey, England, while also finishing third in the 2017 World Games women's lacrosse tournament, held in Wrocław, Poland, behind the United States and Canada, but ahead of Great Britain.

Squad

U-19 Team
The Australian U19 women's national lacrosse team won the gold medal at the 1995 Under-19 World Lacrosse Championship.
As of 2019, their head coach has been Jen Adams.

References

External links
 Australian Lacrosse Association

Women
Lacrosse
Women's lacrosse in Australia
Women's lacrosse teams